Kane/Miller Book Publishers, Inc., now Kane Miller, A Division of EDC Publishing, is a San Diego, California-based specialty children's book publisher of international titles. The company was acquired by the Educational Development Corporation in 2008.

History
Kane Miller was started as Kane/Miller Book Publishers in 1984 by siblings Madeline Kane and Sandy Miller as a small family business, specializing in publishing children’s books from around the world for the US audience.  Miller had previously been involved with importing movies from outside the United States of America, and when he had his first child, he realized the cultural benefits of also bringing in books. The publisher found success in 1993 with Tarō Gomi's Everyone Poops, a Japanese language import that sold over one million copies and is now their best-known title. By 2000, the company closed its Brooklyn, New York offices to be based solely in San Diego, California. Both Kane and Miller retired by 2001. Kira Lynn was named the new head of the company shortly thereafter. The company was acquired by Educational Development Corporation of Tulsa, Oklahoma, in 2008, at which time the line was expanded to include new works by American authors. 

Today, Kane Miller, A Division of EDC Publishing, publish an assortment of board books, picture books, fiction, and nonfiction for readers from infants through middle schoolers, publishing well over 100 new books each year. Kane Miller books are sold by traditional bookstores and by the 60,000+ independent sales consultants of Usborne Books & More. They are not sold at Amazon.

Acquisition 
By December 11, 2008 Kane Miller had been acquired by the Educational Development Corporation (EDC), the sole US trade publisher of the United Kingdom-based Usborne Books. According to Randall White, board chairman, CEO, and President of EDC, the integration of the two companies went smoothly. The move was well received within the publishing industry, and EDC expressed hope that it would increase sales. However, due to the late-2000s recession, sales in the 2009 fiscal year were somewhat decreased.

Products
The majority of Kane Miller's titles originate from publishers outside the US. Recently, Kane Miller began publishing stories from American authors as well, in order to diversify their offerings. The publisher's greatest commercial success was Everyone Poops by Taro Gomi, followed by Wilfrid Gordon McDonald Partridge by Australian author Mem Fox which began its publishing run in 1985, and as of 2005 was nearing one million copies sold. Another top-seller was 2004's Guji Guji by Taiwanese author Chih-Yuan Chen, which sold 65,000 copies between 2004 and 2005. The company became the US distributor of the Anna Hibiscus series by UK-based Nigerian author Atinuke in 2010. Other Kane Miller top sellers include All Better! and Good as New by Henning Löhlein and Bernd Penners, the Shine-a-Light series, and Emma Yarlett's Nibbles series.

Sales 
Kane Miller books have not been sold at Amazon.com since 2012.  Like other books from Educational Development Corporation, they are sold to traditional bookstores and by their direct sales division Usborne Books & More. Usborne Books & More distributes books through thousands of independent consultants who sell directly to the consumer via home shows, direct sales, book fairs, and web sites. Since shortly after their decision to stop selling to Amazon, the company's total sales have increased significantly.

References

Book publishing companies based in California
Children's book publishers
Companies based in San Diego County, California
Publishing companies established in 1984
1984 establishments in California